Media in Kerala, India are widely accessible and cater to a wide variety of audiences. Kerala has the highest media exposure in India with newspapers publishing in nine languages, mainly English and Malayalam.

Print media

Newspapers
Dozens of newspapers are published in Kerala. The principal languages of publication are Malayalam and English. The most widely circulating Malayalam-language newspapers include Malayala Manorama, Mathrubhumi, Desabhimani,Madhyamam, Kerala Kaumudi, Suprabhaatham, Siraj Daily, Veekshanam, Deepika, Mangalam, Janayugam, Thejas, Varthamanam, Chandrika, Janmabhumi, Udaya Keralam and Metro Vaartha.

Magazines
Among list of Malayalam periodicals major Malayalam periodicals are Mathrubhumi weekly, Madhyamam weekly, India Today Malayalam, Dhanam, Chithrabhumi, Balarama (Comics), Thejas, Kanyaka and Bhashaposhini.

The following table is according to the Indian Readership Survey (IRS) 2019 Quarter 1.

Television 
Doordarshan the state-owned television broadcaster started the commercial television broadcast in Kerala with the channel 'DD Malayalam 'on 1 January 1985 from Kudappanakkunnu, Trivandrum.  Malayalam started with a one-hour slot (6.30 PM -7:30 PM IST) daily followed by a 10-minute news bulletin in malayalam. During initial phase Malayalam programs that originated from Doordarshan were available only within 15 km radius of the station.

Multi system operators provide a mix of Malayalam, English, and international channels. The first group to enter the television field was Asianet in 1993, followed by Surya TV in 1998. Kairali TV started broadcast in the year 2000. Multiple channels then started broadcasting including general entertainment channels like (ACV NEWS), Jeevan, Amrita, JaiHind TV, Asianet plus, Surya Movies, Kairali We, Mazhavil Manorama, Flowers,  news channels like Indiavision, Asianet News, Reporter TV, Manorama News, Kairali People, Mathrubhumi News, Media One TV, 24 News Channel, Janam TV and religious channels like Harvest TV, Harvest USA TV, Harvest Arabia, Harvest India, Shalom, Powervision TV. The only government owned channel in Malayalam is Victers TV (Versatile ICT Enabled Resource for Students), an edutainment channel which is working under KITE of General Education department, Kerala

Radio 
In Kerala, Radio had a very vital role in communication. During colonial rule, the erstwhile Travancore state set up the first Radio Station in Kerala. The Princely State of Travancore has granted sanction for setting up a radio broadcasting station at Thiruvananthapuram on 30 September 1937. The radio station was called 'Travancore State Broadcasting Station' and was inaugurated on 12 March 1943 by Sri Chithira Thirunal Balarama Varma. During Initial phase of transmission two hours of radio broadcasting on Friday evenings were aired by the station. After Independence when state of Travancore joined in Indian Union, the 'Travancore State Broadcasting Station' was merged with All India Radio from 1 April 1950. Radio Alakal, the first Community radio in the state, started narrowcasting from Trivandrum on 1 May 2006.Kerala's First private FM station, Radio Mango 91.9, was launched on 29th, November 2007 in Calicut, sparking off the FM revolution in the state. Today, Kerala has a host of private FM channels that are fast gaining influence among its population.

Private FM Stations inside Kerala 

 Thiruvananthapuram

 Club FM 94.3 (The Mathrubhumi Printing And Publishing Co Ltd)
 BIG FM 92.7 (Reliance Anil Dhirubhai Ambani Group)
 Radio Mirchi 98.3 (Entertainment Network India Limited)
 Red FM 93.5 (Sun Network) 
 Radio DC - Community Radio Station (DC School of Management and Technology)

 Kollam
 Radio Benziger 107.8 - Community Radio Station (Bishop Benziger Hospital)

 Karunagapally
 Ente Radio 91.2 - Community Radio Station

 Ambalapuzha
 Global Radio 91.2 FM- Community Radio Station

 Alappuzha
 Club FM 104.8 (The Mathrubhumi Printing And Publishing Co Ltd)

 Radio Mango 92.7 (The Malayala Manorama Co Ltd)

 Radio Neythal 107.8 - Community Radio Station (Diocese of Alappuzha)

 Thiruvalla
 Radio MACFAST 90.4 - Community Radio Station

 Changanacherry
 Radio Media Village 90.8 - Community Radio Station

 Kottayam

 Radio Mangalam 91.2 - Community Radio Station
 Radio Media Village 90.8 - Community Radio Station (St Joseph College of Communication)

 Kochi

 Club FM 94.3 (The Mathrubhumi Printing And Publishing Co Ltd)
 Red FM 93.5 (Sun Network)
 Radio Mango 91.9 (The Malayala Manorama Co Ltd.)
 Radio Mirchi 104, Kochi (Radio Mirchi)

 Thrissur

 Club FM 104.8 (The Mathrubhumi Printing And Publishing Co Ltd)
 Radio Mango 91.9 (The Malayala Manorama Co Ltd)
 BEST FM 95 (Asianet Communications Ltd)
  Red FM 91.1 (Sun Network)
 Hello Radio 90.8 - Community Radio Station

 Palakkad
 Ahalia Voice 90.4 - Community Radio Station
 Kozhikode

 Radio Mango 91.9 (The Malayala Manorama Co Ltd)
 Red FM 93.5 (Sun Network)
 Radio Mirchi 92.7 (Entertainment Network India Limited)
 Club FM 94.3 (The Mathrubhumi Printing And Publishing Co Ltd)

 Wayanad
 Radio Mattoli 90.4 - Community Radio Station (Wayanad Social Service Society)
 Kannur

 Club FM 94.3 (The Mathrubhumi Printing And Publishing Co Ltd)
 Radio Mango 91.9 (The Malayala Manorama Co Ltd)
 Red FM 93.5 (Sun Network)
 BEST FM 95 (Asianet Communications Ltd)

Private AM/FM/SW Stations outside Kerala 

 Dubai

 Asianet Radio 657AM
 Radio Asia 1269 AM
 Club FM 99.6  [The Mathrubhumi Group]
 Radio Me 95.3 FM
 Hit FM 96.7
 Oxygen FM 102.4
 Radio Mango 96.2

 Vatican
 Vatican ShortWave Radio (SW 9505 kHz(31m)) daily at 8:40pm IST

Public sector Radio Channels 

All India Radio (AIR) FM Radio Stations in Kerala

 Thiruvananthapuram -101.9
 Kochi 102.3
 Kochi FM Rainbow 107.5 (Music Channel)
 Thrissur - 103
 Devikulam - 101.4
 Kozhikode - 103.6
 Malappuram -102.7
 Kannur - 101.5

 All India Radio (AIR) AM/MW Radio Stations in Kerala

 Thiruvananthapuram - 1161
 Alapuzha - 576
 Thrissur - 630
 Kozhikode - 684
 Kavaratti - 1584

 All India Radio (AIR) SW Radio Stations in Kerala

 Thiruvananthapuram - 5010,7290

Internet 
Internet service was started by ISPs like Kerala Telecommunication and VSNL in the year 1998. In the same year BPL, a private mobile service provider introduced mobile telephony in Kerala. According to the IAMAI report, titled 'India Internet 2019', Kerala's Internet penetration rate is 54 % which is second highest in India

Cinema

The history of Malayalam cinema begins with Vigathakumaran a silent film made by J.C. Daniel in 1928. The first Malayalam talkie, Balan, came out in 1938.

Udaya Studio, the first professional film studio of Kerala was set up in Alappuzha by Kunchako in 1947. Another landmark was the release of Chemmeen in 1966, directed by Ramu Kariat, which won the President's Gold Medal for the best Indian film.

The first co-operative society for film production, Chitralekha Film Co-operative was promoted by Chithralekha Film Society. This first film society of Kerala was started in 1964 by Adoor Gopalakrishnan and Kulathur Bhaskaran Nair.

other 
podcast: intelerks podcast kerala's first ever recognised podcast

References

External links